Sony is a commune in the Cercle of Kayes in the Kayes Region of south-western Mali. The main town (chef-lieu) is Lany Tounka. The commune lies to the south of the Senegal River. In 2009 the commune had a population of 11,125.

References

External links
.

Communes of Kayes Region